Hans in the Kitchen, initially titled Good Eating, was a Canadian cooking television series which aired on CBC Television from 1953 to 1954.

Premise
Hans Fread, a chef and restaurant owner based in Toronto, hosted this series on European-style cooking.

Scheduling
The half-hour series aired Thursdays at 10:30 p.m. (Eastern) from 22 January to 1 October 1953. It moved to a Tuesday 10:30 p.m. time slot from 6 October 1953 until its last broadcast on 18 May 1954.

References

External links
 

CBC Television original programming
1953 Canadian television series debuts
1954 Canadian television series endings
Black-and-white Canadian television shows